Prunus lusitanica, the Portuguese laurel cherry or Portugal laurel, is a species of flowering plant in the rose family Rosaceae, native to southwestern France, Spain, Portugal, Morocco, and Macaronesia (the Azores, Canary Islands and Madeira).

The split between the two subspecies (subsp. azorica, found in the Azores, and subsp. hixa / subsp. lusitanica, found elsewhere) is dated around the Pliocene.

Description
Prunus lusitanica is an evergreen shrub or small tree growing to 3-8m tall (though it can reach 15-20m in cultivation). The bark is smooth and dark-grey. The leaves are alternate, oval, 7–15 cm long and 3–5 cm broad, with an acute apex and a dentate margin, glossy dark green above, lighter below. They superficially resemble those of the bay laurel, which accounts for its often being mistaken for one.

The flowers are small (10–15 mm diameter) with five small white petals; they are produced on erect or spreading racemes 15–25 cm long in late spring. The fruit is a small cherry-like drupe 8–13 mm in diameter, green or reddish green at first, turning dark purple or black when ripe in late summer or early autumn.

Distribution and habitat

Prunus lusitanica  is rare in the wild, found mainly along mountain streams, preferring sunshine and moist but well-drained soils. It is moderately drought-tolerant. It reproduces either sexually (the most successful method) or asexually by cloning from shoots.

Name
The species was first scientifically described by Linnaeus in Species Plantarum in 1753. Its specific epithet lusitanica means "of Lusitania", referring to the Roman name for Portugal.

Subspecies
Three subspecies are accepted:
Prunus lusitanica subsp. lusitanica. Mainland Europe.
Prunus lusitanica subsp. azorica (Mouill.) Franco. Azores.
Prunus lusitanica subsp. hixa (Willd.) Franco. Canary Islands, Madeira, Morocco.

Cultivation
Prunus lusitanica is grown as an ornamental shrub and is widely planted as a hedge and for screening in gardens and parks.  It is introduced and locally naturalised in the temperate zone in northern France, Great Britain, Ireland, New Zealand, Western Canada- including the southern BC Mainland and Vancouver Island From Victoria Up Island through the Cowichan, Nanaimo and Parksville as well as the western United States in California, Oregon and Washington State.

Similar to its relative Prunus laurocerasus, P. lusitanica has been recognized by some botanists and land managers in both western Washington and Oregon as invasive. It is thought to have spread from cultivated areas into natural areas by birds who consume the fruit and then defecate the seeds away from the source plant.

It has gained the Royal Horticultural Society's Award of Garden Merit.

Toxicity
The leaves of Prunus lusitanica contain cyanide and will release this into the environment if burnt or if crushed. The fruit is somewhat edible if fully ripe, but if it is bitter, it is toxic and should not be eaten.

References

External links

 

lusitanica
Flora of France
Flora of Spain
Flora of Portugal
Flora of Morocco
Flora of Macaronesia
Flora of the Azores
Flora of the Canary Islands
Flora of Madeira
Garden plants of Africa
Garden plants of Europe
Drought-tolerant plants
Plants described in 1753
Taxa named by Carl Linnaeus
Taxobox binomials not recognized by IUCN
Flora of the Mediterranean Basin